Illinois Field was a stadium in Champaign, Illinois.  It hosted the Illinois Fighting Illini football  team until they moved to the Memorial Stadium in 1923 and the school's baseball team until they moved to the current Illinois Field in 1988.  The stadium held 17,000 people at its peak.

Events
The field hosted the 1982 Big Ten Conference baseball tournament, won by Minnesota.

References

Defunct college football venues
Defunct college baseball venues in the United States
Illinois Fighting Illini baseball venues
Illinois Fighting Illini football venues
American football venues in Illinois
Sports venues in Champaign–Urbana, Illinois